The chimpanzee–human last common ancestor (CHLCA) is the last common ancestor shared by the extant Homo (human) and Pan (chimpanzee and bonobo) genera of Hominini. Due to complex hybrid speciation, it is not currently possible to give a precise estimate on the age of this ancestral population. While "original divergence" between populations may have occurred as early as 13 million years ago (Miocene), hybridization may have been ongoing until as recently as 4 million years ago (Pliocene).

In human genetic studies, the CHLCA is useful as an anchor point for calculating single-nucleotide polymorphism (SNP) rates in human populations where chimpanzees are used as an outgroup, that is, as the extant species most genetically similar to Homo sapiens.

Taxonomy

The taxon tribe Hominini was proposed to separate humans (genus Homo) from chimpanzees (Pan) and gorillas (genus Gorilla) on the notion that the least similar species should be separated from the other two.  However, later evidence revealed that Pan and Homo are closer genetically than are Pan and Gorilla; thus, Pan was referred to the tribe Hominini with Homo. Gorilla now became the separated genus and was referred to the new taxon 'tribe Gorillini'.

Mann and Weiss (1996), proposed that the tribe Hominini should encompass Pan and Homo, grouped in separate subtribes. They classified Homo and all bipedal apes in the subtribe Hominina and Pan  in the subtribe Panina. (Wood (2010) discussed the different views of this taxonomy.)   A "chimpanzee clade" was posited by Wood and Richmond, who referred it to a tribe Panini, which was envisioned from the family Hominidae being composed of a trifurcation of subfamilies.

Richard Wrangham (2001) argued that the CHLCA species was very similar to the common chimpanzee (Pan troglodytes) – so much so that it should be classified as a member of the genus Pan and be given the taxonomic name Pan prior.

All the human-related genera of tribe Hominini that arose after divergence from Pan are members of the subtribe Hominina, including the genera Homo and Australopithecus. This group represents "the human clade" and its members are called "hominins".

Fossil evidence
No fossil has yet conclusively been identified as the CHLCA. A possible candidate is Graecopithecus. This would put the CHLCA split in Southeast Europe instead of Africa.

Sahelanthropus tchadensis is an extinct hominine with some morphology proposed (and disputed) to be as expected of the CHLCA, and it lived some 7 million years ago – close to the time of the chimpanzee–human divergence. But it is unclear whether it should be classified as a member of the tribe Hominini, that is, a hominin, as an ancestor of Homo and Pan and a potential candidate for the CHLCA species itself, or simply a Miocene ape with some convergent anatomical similarity to many later hominins.

Ardipithecus most likely appeared after the human-chimpanzee split, some 5.5 million years ago, at a time when hybridization may still have been ongoing. It has several shared characteristics with chimpanzees, but due to its fossil incompleteness and the proximity to the human-chimpanzee split, the exact position of Ardipithecus in the fossil record is unclear. It is most likely derived from the chimpanzee lineage and thus not ancestral to humans. However, Sarmiento (2010), noting that Ardipithecus does not share any characteristics exclusive to humans and some of its characteristics (those in the wrist and basicranium), suggested that it may have diverged from the common human/African ape stock prior to the human, chimpanzee and gorilla divergence.

The earliest fossils clearly in the human but not the chimpanzee lineage appear between about 4.5 to 4 million years ago, with Australopithecus anamensis.

Few fossil specimens on the "chimpanzee-side" of the split have been found; the first fossil chimpanzee, dating between 545 and 284 kyr (thousand years, radiometric), was discovered in Kenya's East African Rift Valley (McBrearty, 2005). All extinct genera listed in the taxobox are ancestral to Homo, or are offshoots of such. However, both Orrorin and Sahelanthropus existed around the time of the divergence, and so either one or both may be ancestral to both genera Homo and Pan.

Due to the scarcity of fossil evidence for CHLCA candidates, Mounier (2016) presented a project to create a "virtual fossil" by applying digital "morphometrics" and statistical algorithms to fossils from across the evolutionary history of both Homo and Pan, having previously used this technique to visualize a skull of the last common ancestor of Neanderthal and Homo sapiens.

Age estimates
An estimate of TCHLCA of 10 to 13 million years was proposed in 1998, and a range of 7 to 10 million years ago is assumed by White et al. (2009):

Some researchers tried to estimate the age of the CHLCA (TCHLCA) using biopolymer structures that differ slightly between closely related animals. Among these researchers, Allan C. Wilson and Vincent Sarich were pioneers in the development of the molecular clock for humans. Working on protein sequences, they eventually (1971) determined that apes were closer to humans than some paleontologists perceived based on the fossil record. Later, Vincent Sarich concluded that the TCHLCA was no older than 8 million years in age, with a favored range between 4 and 6 million years before present.

This paradigmatic age has stuck with molecular anthropology until the late 1990s. Since the 1990s, the estimate has again been pushed towards more-remote times, because studies have found evidence for a slowing of the molecular clock as apes evolved from a common monkey-like ancestor with monkeys, and humans evolved from a common ape-like ancestor with non-human apes.

A 2016 study analyzed transitions at CpG sites in genome sequences, which exhibit a more clocklike behavior than other substitutions, arriving at an estimate for human and chimpanzee divergence time of 12.1 million years.

Hybrid speciation
A source of confusion in determining the exact age of the Pan–Homo split is evidence of a more complex speciation process than a clean split between the two lineages. Different chromosomes appear to have split at different times, possibly over as much as a 4-million-year period, indicating a long and drawn out speciation process with large-scale hybridization events between the two emerging lineages as recently as 6.3 to 5.4 million years ago, according to Patterson et al. (2006).

Speciation between Pan and Homo occurred over the last 9 million years. Ardipithecus probably branched off of the Pan lineage in the middle Miocene Messinian. After the original divergences, there were, according to Patterson (2006), periods of hybridization between population groups and a process of alternating divergence and hybridization that lasted several million years. Some time during the late Miocene or early Pliocene, the earliest members of the human clade completed a final separation from the lineage of Pan – with date estimates ranging from 13 million to as recent as 4 million years ago. The latter date and the argument for hybridization events are rejected by Wakeley.

The assumption of late hybridization was in particular based on the similarity of the X chromosome in humans and chimpanzees, suggesting a divergence as late as some 4  million years ago. This conclusion was rejected as unwarranted by Wakeley (2008), who suggested alternative explanations, including selection pressure on the X chromosome in the populations ancestral to the CHLCA.

Complex speciation and incomplete lineage sorting of genetic sequences seem to also have happened in the split between the human lineage and that of the gorilla, indicating "messy" speciation is the rule rather than the exception in large primates. Such a scenario would explain why the divergence age between the Homo and Pan has varied with the chosen method and why a single point has so far been hard to track down.

See also
 History of hominoid taxonomy
 List of human evolution fossils (with images)

Notes

References

External links

 Human Timeline (Interactive) – Smithsonian, National Museum of Natural History (August 2016).
 Locomotion and posture from the common hominoid ancestor to fully modern hominins, with special reference to the last common panin/hominin ancestor - R H Crompton E E Vereecke and S K S Thorpe, Journal of Anatomy, April 2008

Human evolution
Hominini
Homininae
Last common ancestors
Chimpanzees
Events in biological evolution